Frame (stylized as FRAME) is an American fashion-retail company that designs and sells high-end clothing for men and women. The company is known for its  denim jeans and hand bags sold at retail outlets in the United States that were first popular with models Karlie Kloss, Miranda Kerr, and Emily Ratajkowski.

History
Frame was founded in 2012 by Swedish entrepreneurs Erik Torstensson and Jens Grede following careers at creative agency, The Saturday Group, in which the founders sold a majority stake to Omnicom in 2015.

Frame's first product, the “Le Skinny de Jeanne,” was first worn by actors and supermodels including Miranda Kerr, Poppy Delevingne, Lily Aldridge, Kate Bosworth, and Karlie Kloss. The company's first bag, a leather tote called “Les Second,” was modeled by Sienna Miller, Katie Holmes, Alessandra Ambrosio, and Doutzen Kroes.

In 2014 and 2018, Frame founders Erik Torstensson and Jens Grede were named to  Business of Fashion's BoF 500 list of people shaping the global fashion industry. According to The Sourcing Journal, Frame earned over $130 million in revenue in 2018. As of 2021 the company owns and operates sixteen stores in Austin, Aspen, Boston, Dallas, Greenwich, Houston, Los Angeles, London, New York, and San Francisco. Its brand collaborations include Imaan Hammam, Mejuri, the Carlyle Hotel, and Jordan Barrett.

References

External links
 

Retail companies of the United States
Clothing brands of the United States
American companies established in 2012